Bergeria bourgognei is a moth of the family Erebidae. It was described by Sergius G. Kiriakoff in 1952. It is found in the Democratic Republic of the Congo.

References

Syntomini
Moths described in 1952
Insects of the Democratic Republic of the Congo
Erebid moths of Africa
Endemic fauna of the Democratic Republic of the Congo